BBC National DAB is a digital audio broadcasting multiplex in the UK, for a number of radio stations which have UK wide coverage.  The multiplex is owned and operated by the BBC and is transmitted from a number of transmitter sites across the country; it only carries BBC radio stations.

As of the end of 2017, more than 97% of the UK's population are within reach of the multiplex following the completion of the switching on of a fourth set of new transmitters over the previous two years which had seen the reach increase from 93%. Any further expansion of DAB radio is awaiting a decision by Government on any possible digital radio switchover.

Stations carried
The following channels are receivable on any digital-equipped DAB radio in the BBC National DAB coverage area:

Full time services

Part time services 
The BBC National DAB multiplex makes use of dynamic ensemble reconfiguration to allow a number of part-time services to broadcast.  While these additional services are on air the bit rates of (one or more of) BBC Radio 3, BBC Radio 4, BBC Radio 5 Live, and data services are reduced.

"Pop-up" services 
The BBC has experimented with short-term "Pop-up" digital radio stations, each broadcasting for approximately four days at a time, covering music festivals and other special events. The first to broadcast was BBC Radio 5 Live Olympics Extra in 2012, then BBC Radio 2 Eurovision launched for the first time in 2014, and was joined by BBC Radio 2 Country, BBC Music Jazz in 2015 and BBC Radio 2 50s in April 2016. When these temporary stations are on air, there is normally a reduction in bit rate of their parent station.

Station closures 
BBC Asian Network was due to be axed in around 2011 after plans to close down the station were published. The BBC also planned to close 6 Music. Since then both stations have been saved from closure – 6 Music was retained after listening figures increased and a campaign was set up on Facebook which had 180,000 supporters.

See also
Timeline of Digital Audio Broadcasting in the UK

References

BBC Radio
Digital audio broadcasting multiplexes